NRK P1+ is a radio station, run by Norwegian Broadcasting Corporation (NRK). It is broadcast on DAB and online.  The channel has its origin from NRK P1 and is intended for an adult audience. The broadcasts started on 2 October 2013 as part of NRK's digital radio offerings. Program Manager Line Gevelt Andersen led the effort in designing the channel.

References

External links 
 NRK P1+ online radio

2013 establishments in Norway
NRK
Radio stations established in 2013
Radio stations in Norway